Schubert Reilley Dyche (February 11, 1893 – October 19, 1982) was an American college football and college basketball head coach as well as athletic director, all at Montana State University, from the 1920s through 1940s. In football, he recorded a 36–53–7 overall record, including one conference championship during the 1938 season. In men's basketball, he recorded a 110–93 overall record. His 1928–29 Bobcats team finished the season with a 36–2 record and was retroactively named the national champion by the Helms Athletic Foundation and the Premo-Porretta Power Poll. That squad is considered to be one of the greatest college teams in the first half of the 20th century.

Head coaching record

Football

 The minimum number of conference games needed to be played to compete for the conference championship was five.

Basketball

References

1893 births
1982 deaths
Basketball coaches from Kansas
College men's basketball head coaches in the United States
Montana State Bobcats athletic directors
Montana State Bobcats football coaches
Montana State Bobcats men's basketball coaches
University of Utah alumni
Sportspeople from Topeka, Kansas